Stet is an unincorporated community on the Ray/Carroll County line and part of the Kansas City metropolitan area. It is located approximately fourteen miles northwest of Carrollton at the intersection of Missouri Supplemental Routes K and JJ.

History
A post office called Stet was established in 1890, and remained in operation until 1973. That same year, the rural route was consolidated with Norborne but the building stayed open as a contract office until 2011. The origin of the name "Stet" is obscure. The meaning of Stet in Latin is "let it stand."

References

Unincorporated communities in Ray County, Missouri
Unincorporated communities in Carroll County, Missouri
Unincorporated communities in Missouri